Denise Scharley (born Neuilly-en-Thelle, 15 February 1917 – died Versailles, 26 July 2011) was a French contralto who made her debut in 1942, singing Pelléas et Mélisande at the Opéra-Comique.

Long associated with French opera, she starred as Madame de Croissy in the Paris première of Poulenc's Dialogues of the Carmelites. She was also associated with the female lead roles of Carmen and Samson and Delilah.

Recording
 Francis Poulenc: Dialogues of the Carmelites (Denise Duval, Denise Scharley, Régine Crespin, Liliane Berton, Rita Gorr, and others; National Theater of the Paris Opera orchestra and chorus; Pierre Dervaux, conductor) EMI 62768

References

External links
 Pines, Roger, "Four Glories of Interwar French Vocalism", The Opera Quarterly - Volume 19, Number 3, Summer 2003, pp. 529–541

1917 births
2011 deaths
People from Oise
French contraltos
French operatic mezzo-sopranos
20th-century French women opera singers